Events from the year 1694 in Sweden

Incumbents
 Monarch – Charles XI

Events

 - Building of the Steninge Palace
 The Great Jewel Fraud against the Swedish National Bank is exposed, in which five women, around their leader Greta Duréel, are discovered to have stolen money for years through a deposition fraud.

Births

 28 October - Johan Helmich Roman, composer (died 1758) 
 - Brigitta Sahlgren, industrialist (died 1771)

Deaths

 22 August - Maria Sofia De la Gardie, industrialist   (born 1627) 
 July - Philip Christoph von Königsmarck, soldier and lover of Sophia Dorothea of Celle  (born 1665)

References

 
Years of the 17th century in Sweden
Sweden